Hoovu Mullu is a 1968 Indian Kannada film, directed by A. V. Sheshagiri Rao and produced by A L A Naidu. The film stars Udaykumar, Kalpana, Balakrishna and Dikki Madhavarao in lead roles. The film had musical score by Chellapilla Satyam.

Cast

Udaykumar as Bhima
Kalpana as Cheluvi
Balakrishna
Dikki Madhava Rao
M. P. Shankar
Ranga
H. R. Shastry
Sadhana
Renuka
A. L. Abbaiah Naidu
Shanthinidevi
Vijayaleela
Vijayaprabha
Jayaram
Devaraj
Anvaruddin
Nagesh Rao
Venkataramanappa

References

External links
 

1968 films
1960s Kannada-language films
Films scored by Satyam (composer)
Films directed by A. V. Seshagiri Rao